Rutilio di Lorenzo Manetti (c. 1571 – 22 July 1639) was an Italian painter of late-Mannerism or proto-Baroque, active mainly in Siena.

Biography
He was influenced and/or taught by the local artists Francesco Vanni and Ventura Salimbeni. He is known to have collaborated with Raffaello Vanni, the son of Francesco. Among his masterpieces are his contributions to the Casino Mediceo, which he worked alongside Matteo Rosselli, Giovanni Lanfranco, and Cesare Dandini. One of his pupils or followers is Stefano Volpi.

He is known for the following works in Siena or nearby towns: Story of St Catherine and Pope Gregory (1597; Palazzo Pubblico), Baptism of Christ (1600; church of San Giovannino in Pantaneto); a fresco cycle of the Story of St Roch (1605–1610; San Rocco alla Lupa), Pope Alexander I freed from prison by an Angel from San Giovanni Battista in Sant'Ansano in Greti; a Temptation of Saint Anthony (1620, Sant'Agostino); a Rest on the Flight to Egypt (San Pietro alle Scale, Siena); a Death of Blessed Antonino Patrizi (Monticiano, 1616), a Blessed Domenico dal Pozzo at the table now in the Certosa of Florence, a Birth of Virgin (1625, Church of Santa Maria dei Servi), and a painting (1628, Church of San Domenico). He painted a remarkable Allegory of the four seasons and a Parable of the blind men, now in private collections. He also contributed to the Casino Mediceo.

His style moved from one derived from Barocci to a more Caravaggesque manner after the first decade of the 17th century. Whether this change was mediated by local painters from Siena and Florence, or from direct visits to Rome, is unclear.

Sources
Artnet biography from Grove encyclopedia of Art
Italycyberguide biography
 Getty ULAN entry
The Manetti Exhibition in Siena, Charles McCorquodale. The Burlington Magazine. (1978) Vol 120 (909): pages 885-889.

External links

1570s births
1639 deaths
16th-century Italian painters
Italian male painters
17th-century Italian painters
Painters from Siena
Mannerist painters